Since opening in 2007, The O2 Arena has hosted hundreds of concerts from UK and international superstars. It was named the World's Best Venue by Pollstar in 2009. It has been named as the busiest indoor arena in the world with over 1,819,487 tickets sold in 2015 alone.

Below is a list of artists that have performed at the arena since its opening in 2007.

2007 – 2010

2011 – 2020

2021 – Present

References 

Entertainment events at O2 Arena
Entertainment events in the United Kingdom
Events in London
History of the Royal Borough of Greenwich
Lists of events by venue
Lists of events in the United Kingdom
Entertainment events at O2 Arena